Zvonko Milojević (born August 30, 1971) is a retired Serbian football goalkeeper.

Club career
Having made his first team debut for Red Star Belgrade at only 17 years of age in the return leg of the 1989-90 UEFA Cup matchup versus 1. FC Köln, his first years with the club were spent as a deputy to Stevan Stojanović. After Stojanović moved on in summer 1991 following the European Cup win, 20-year-old Milojević shared the goalkeeping load with Dragoje Leković who was brought in. The following year Milojević became the first choice goalie and continued as such until 1997 when he left. Afterward, he continued his career in Belgium where he played for Anderlecht and Lokeren.

On November 15, 2007 Milojević was involved in a car accident in Germany in which he received severe injuries. As of today he's still recuperating and fighting to regain the strength needed to walk again.

International career
Milojević played for FR Yugoslavia from 1995 to 1997, making 10 appearances.

Honours
Anderlecht
Belgian Super Cup: 2000

References

External links
 Profile at Serbian federation site
 Дете из Светозарева - Звонко Милојевић

1971 births
Living people
Yugoslav footballers
Serbian footballers
Serbia and Montenegro international footballers
Yugoslav First League players
Belgian Pro League players
FK Jagodina players
Red Star Belgrade footballers
R.S.C. Anderlecht players
K.S.C. Lokeren Oost-Vlaanderen players
Expatriate footballers in Belgium
Association football goalkeepers
Sportspeople from Jagodina
Serbian expatriate footballers
Serbia and Montenegro expatriate footballers
Serbia and Montenegro footballers
Serbian expatriate sportspeople in Belgium
Serbia and Montenegro expatriate sportspeople in Belgium